The University Museum and Art Gallery (UMAG) is located at 90 Bonham Road, next to the University of Hong Kong's East Gate entrance. Its exhibition galleries occupy the Fung Ping Shan Building as well as the first floor of the TT Tsui Building, where also the Museum Store is housed on the ground floor. The two buildings are joined by a bridge.

The Fung Ping Shan Building was graded as a Grade II Historic Building in 1981 and the exterior of Fung Ping Shan Building is now a declared monument under the Antiquities and Monuments Ordinance.

Collections and temporary exhibitions
UMAG houses a collection of Chinese antiquities, notably bronzes, ceramics, paintings and furniture and lacquer that has been built over the past sixty years through acquisition and donation. Artworks date from the Neolithic period to our contemporary era. Highlights in the bronze collection include works from the Shang to the Tang dynasty and the world’s largest collection of Yuan dynasty Nestorian crosses. The Museum also has a comprehensive collection of Chinese ceramics, as well as carvings in jade, wood and stone, and a representative group of Chinese oil paintings. In recent years, the Museum has also been collecting historical photographs of Hong Kong and items of popular culture. In 2020, the Museum launched a new initiative called UMAG_STArts that explores the symbiotic relationship between science, technology, and the arts through the interdisciplinary studies of art history, conservation, and novel forms of technology.

The University of Hong Kong Museum Society
The University of Hong Kong Museum Society (HKUMS) was established in 1988 by Mrs. Margaret Wang, whose husband Dr. Wang Gungwu was Vice-Chancellor of the HKU from 1986 to 1996. Since then, HKUMS, a non-profit organization whose role has been to provide support to the UMAG, has become a vital force in the promotion of art and culture in the Hong Kong community.

HKUMS is governed by an Executive Committee composed of volunteer members. The Committee organizes a variety of regular activities related to art and culture, including lectures and seminars, museum and gallery tours, visits to private collections and artists’ studios, heritage walks and overseas trips. Proceeds generated from the Society’s activities are donated to the UMAG for the acquisition of selective artworks, the sponsorship of special exhibitions and notable programs, as well as to HKU and the local community for the support of educational initiatives.

See also
 The University of Hong Kong
 Tsui Museum of Art (former museum)

References

External links

 Official Homepage
List of past exhibitions at the University Museum and Art Gallery, Hong Kong 

1953 establishments in Hong Kong
Art museums established in 1953
Art museums and galleries in Hong Kong
University of Hong Kong
University museums in Hong Kong
Declared monuments of Hong Kong